"Miss Me Blind" is a song by English new wave band Culture Club. Known for an iconic guitar solo midway through the song, it was the third single released from the album Colour by Numbers in North America, peaking at number 5 on the US Billboard Hot 100 chart in spring 1984. This gave the band its sixth consecutive top 10 hit in the US, as well as its final top 10 hit in that country, although the group would score several other top 20 hits in the US.

The single reached number 5 in Canada, and was also released in several South American countries, Australia, and Japan. It was also the band's biggest R&B hit, reaching number 5 on the US Billboard Soul/R&B chart.

The song is a catchy R&B-pop number that alludes to a love-gone-sour relationship. The song's lyrics "But you know/I'm never really sure/If you're just kissing to be clever", is a reference to the band's debut album title.

Cash Box said that the song illustrates lead singer "Boy George’s knack for finding the right beat for the right lyrics and singing them in the right way" and that his vocal is "well complemented by an unflagging beat and soulful background vocals."

In most countries (like the US, Canada, and Japan), the B-side was the ballad "Colour by Numbers". In Mexico, the B-side was "Victims", which was also a major hit in the United Kingdom and several European and African countries. In Brazil, the B-side was "Boy Boy (I'm The Boy)", a song featured on the group's debut album.

A very popular 12-inch was issued, gaining big success in American clubs and elsewhere. The popular extended 12-inch version contained extracts of the other Culture Club hit of the spring, "It's a Miracle". In the US, the "Miss Me Blind" / "It's a Miracle" 12" single reached #10 on the Billboard Hot Dance Club Play chart in May 1984.

The official music video features the four members of Culture Club in a Japanese setting; Japan was one of several countries where the band was extremely popular. The music video was directed by Steve Barron.

Backing vocals on "Miss Me Blind" were performed by R&B singer Jermaine Stewart.

Formats and track listings
7"
A. "Miss Me Blind" – 4:28
B. "Colour by Numbers" (non-album track) – 3:57
(Released at least in the USA, Canada, Australia, France, Italy, and Japan)
A. "Miss Me Blind" – 4:28
B. "Victims" – 4:56
(Released in Mexico)
A. "Miss Me Blind" – 4:31
B. "Boy, Boy (I'm the Boy)" – 3:46
(Released in Brazil)
12"
A. "Miss Me Blind/It's a Miracle" (Extended Dance Remix) – 9:08
B. "Colour by Numbers" – 3:57
(Released in the USA and Canada)
A. "It's a Miracle/Miss Me Blind" (US Remix) – 9:08
B1. "Love Twist" – 4:23
B2. "Melting Pot" (live) – 4:30
(Released in France)

Charts

Weekly charts

Year-end charts

References

1984 singles
Culture Club songs
Music videos directed by Steve Barron
1983 songs
Virgin Records singles
Epic Records singles
Song recordings produced by Steve Levine
Songs written by Boy George
Songs written by Roy Hay (musician)
Songs written by Mikey Craig
Songs written by Jon Moss